Wesley may refer to:

People and fictional characters
 Wesley (name), a given name and a surname

Places

United States
 Wesley, Arkansas, an unincorporated community
 Wesley, Georgia, an unincorporated community
 Wesley Township, Will County, Illinois
 Wesley, Iowa, a city in Kossuth County
 Wesley Township, Kossuth County, Iowa
 Wesley, Maine, a town
 Wesley Township, Washington County, Ohio
 Wesley, Oklahoma, an unincorporated community
 Wesley, Indiana, an unincorporated town
 Wesley, West Virginia, an unincorporated community

Elsewhere
 Wesley, a hamlet in the township of Stone Mills, Ontario, Canada
 Wesley, Dominica, a village
 Wesley, New Zealand, a suburb of Auckland
 Wesley, Eastern Cape,          South Africa, a town

Schools
 Wesley College (disambiguation)
 Wesley Institute, Sydney, Australia
 Wesley Seminary, Marion, Indiana
 Wesley Biblical Seminary, Jackson, Mississippi
 Wesley Theological Seminary, Washington, DC
 Wesley University of Science and Technology, Ondo, Nigeria
 Wesley Girls' High School, Ghana

Other uses
 Wesley (film), a 2009 film
 Wesley (TV series), a 1949 American sitcom
 Wesley House (disambiguation)
 Wesley Hospital (Brisbane), Australia

See also
 Wesley Church (disambiguation)
 Wesley Chapel (disambiguation)
 Wesley's Chapel, London, England
 Wesley Methodist Cathedral (disambiguation)
 Wesley Foundation
 Wesley Mission, various United Church missions
 Westley (disambiguation)
 Vesly (disambiguation)